Ctenoplusia calceolaris is a moth of the family Noctuidae first described by Francis Walker in 1858. It is found in the Antilles, including the Dominican Republic and Cuba.

References

Moths described in 1858
Plusiinae